The football (soccer) Campeonato Brasileiro Série B 2002, the second level of Brazilian National League, was played from August 11 to December 22, 2001. The competition had 28 clubs and two of them were promoted to Série A and six were relegated to Série C. The competition was won by Paysandu.

Paysandu finished the final phase group with the most points, and was declared 2001 Brazilian Série B champions, claiming the promotion to the 2002 Série A along with Figueirense, the runners-up. The six worst ranked teams in the first round (Sergipe, Tuna Luso, ABC, Desportiva, Nacional-AM and Serra) were relegated to play Série C in 2002.

Format
The 28 teams were divided into two groups, win which each team played against each other twice. The four best placed teams in each group qualified to the quarter-finals, in which the first-placed team of the South-Southeastern Group played against the fourth-placed team of the North-Northeastern Group, the second-placed team of the South-Southeastern Group played against the third-placed team of the North-Northeastern Group, the third-placed team of the South-Southeastern Group played against the second-placed team of the North-Northeastern Group, and the fourth-placed team of the South-Southeastern Group played against the first-placed team of the North-Northeastern Group. The quarter-finals were played over two legs, and in case of tie in points, in case the away goals rule wasn't applicable, the team with the best campaign in the first phase of the two would qualify.the winners qualified to the final phase, in each the remaining four teams played against each other twice. The two best on this group would achieve promotion to the Série A of the following year. The six worst teams in the first stage were relegated to the Campeonato Brasileiro Série C of the following year.

Teams

First stage

North-Northeastern Group

South-Southeastern Group

Relegation playoff

Quarterfinals

Final stage

Final standings

Sources

Campeonato Brasileiro Série B seasons
2001 in Brazilian football leagues